Vĩnh Trạch is a rural commune of Bạc Liêu city in Bạc Liêu Province, Vietnam.

References

Communes of Bạc Liêu province
Populated places in Bạc Liêu province